Checkmate Savage is the debut studio album by Scottish indie rock band The Phantom Band, released on 26 January 2009 through Chemikal Underground Records to critical acclaim.

The album was produced by Paul Savage, formerly of The Delgados.

On 25 January 2019 Chemikal Underground released a deluxe double vinyl gatefold edition of the album to celebrate its 10th anniversary.

Title
According to the band, the album's title refers to: "over-population, dwindling natural resources and the yawning void within every one of us caused by society's unnatural social contracts, and mass sexual repression, means one thing: it's checkmate for the human animal."

Accolades
In December 2009, Checkmate Savage entered The Skinny's "Scottish Albums of the Decade" list at #28.

The album placed at number 17 in MOJO magazine's top 50 albums of 2009.

In January 2010 the album was given the inaugural "Soundcheck Award" for album of 2009 by Radioeins and Der Tagesspiegel in Berlin.

Track listing
 "The Howling" - 6:35
 "Burial Sounds" - 4:47
 "Folk Song Oblivion - 4:14
 "Crocodile" - 7:42
 "Halfhound" - 4:11
 "Left Hand Wave" - 5:40
 "Island" - 8:51
 "Throwing Bones" - 5:01
 "The Whole is on My Side" - 7:53

Personnel
 Duncan Marquiss - guitar, vocals, percussion, fx, artwork
 Gerry Hart - bass, vocals, percussion, fx, artwork
 Andy Wake - synthesizers, vocals, samples, percussion, fx, artwork
 Rick Anthony - guitar, vocals, percussion, fx, artwork
 Damien Tonner - drums, percussion, fx, artwork
 James SK Wān - bamboo flute
 Greg Sinclair - guitar, pedals/fx, percussion, artwork
 Paul Savage - producer
 Jamie Savage - engineer
 Kenny MacLeod - mastering
 Christopher O'Donnell - flexatone ("Throwing Bones")
 Aztext - design

References

The Phantom Band albums
2009 albums
Chemikal Underground albums